Tuntian (屯田) or Tunken (屯墾) is a type of frontier "military-agricultural colonies" over the history of China. Troops were sent to harsh landscapes at the Chinese frontier to turn uncultivated land into self-sustained, agrarian settler colonies. In other words, the soldiers doubled as farmers.

Han dynasty

The Tuntian system or "Strategy of military farms" evolved during the famous victorious campaign of 61–60 BC by  against the Qiang people, which presumed ancestors of the Tibetans.

While the tuntian system was made famous by Cao Cao's administration ( 196–220 CE), Cao Cao's writings show that the system had been instituted as early as the Western Han dynasty during the reign of Emperor Wu ( 141–87 BCE), where soldiers on distant expeditions were set to work converting and farming the conquered land, both to provide food for the army and to convert the conquered land into agricultural land. After the death of Emperor Wu, however, the system was only used sporadically and therefore less effectively.

The final years of the Eastern Han dynasty ( 189–220 CE) witnessed great economic disruption and widespread devastation, particularly through the Yellow Turban Rebellion of 184 CE; agricultural production in particular was severely disrupted, and population movements from war-ravaged areas led to massive flows of refugees. It was under these circumstances that Cao Cao's use of the tuntian system made its impact on the economic revival of China after the damage suffered previously.

Method
The mechanism of the 'civilian tuntian' system as implemented by Cao Cao had its basis in government organisation, encouragement and, to some extent, coercion. Peasants without land, refugees and soldiers were assigned to plots of land which they were to farm, while the implements required (such as ploughs and oxen) were provided by the government at a low price. In exchange for this, the peasant was to give over half of his harvest to the government.

The tuntian system had its origins in the military, and for much of the Han dynasty the land in question was farmed by soldiers on orders of the military authorities; in this case all of the crop harvested was to be kept by the military for supply uses, following the example set by Emperor Wu. Cao Cao's innovation was the introduction of the 'civilian tuntian' on a large scale both for common people and for soldiers during peacetime, whereby he successfully solved two great economic problems facing his administration: the large number of unemployed refugees, and the great tracts of land abandoned by big proprietors in the preceding chaos.

Impact
The tuntian system was to have far-reaching effects, both for Cao Cao himself and for the overall economy of China. Once the scheme had proven successful initially, Cao Cao wasted no time in extending the scheme to all areas under his control; as a result the positive effects of this organised farming was soon felt all over northern China, which he reunified.

In the short-term, meanwhile, the tuntian system was also instrumental to the success of Cao Cao's campaigns, many of which were long-range offensives across the plains of northern China; with a massive and efficient agriculture to support his army, he was able to sustain these offensives and gain victory. Overall, the tuntian system, along with the repair of irrigation works, were among the foremost contributions of Cao Cao to the economy of the Han dynasty, and contributed to the enduring strength of the state of Cao Wei in the Three Kingdoms period.

Ming dynasty
The tuntian in Ming dynasty had two variants, known as Tunpu (屯堡) and Weisuo (衛所制).

Qing dynasty
Tuntian was widely practiced to fight the Dungan Revolt (1862–1877).

People's Republic of China
Tuntian was known as tuanchang (团场, literally "Regiment farms"), a military-run polity established by the Xinjiang Production and Construction Corps since 1953. A large amount of other P&C Corps were established in 1968-1970 (see the Chinese Wikipedia disambiguation page for P&C Corps) and all were disbanded by 1976. 

The general concept of fully government-owned agricultural developments in the PRC is known as nóngkĕn. A  is part of the State Council of the People's Republic of China during the periods of 1956–1970 and 1979–1982. It controlled state-owned farms including tuanchang. Nóngkĕn in a broader sense would also include smaller-scale farms managed by government assets such as schools; these are outside of the Ministry's scope.

Other countries
The term tuntian is exported to a number of countries in the East Asian cultural sphere, forming their own readings, some of which are Sino-Xenic.

Taiwan
The Han-led Kingdom of Tungning practiced a variant of the Ming-era Tuntian system. The system was established by Koxinga immediately after landing in 1661 to supply his troops. Many places in southwest Taiwan retain their tuntian names.

Viet Nam 
The Sino-Vietnamese reading is đồn điền in Vietnamese. During the Nam tiến (March to the South), Khmer and Cham territory was seized and militarily colonised by the Vietnamese. The Nguyen Lords established đồn điền after 1790.

The South Vietnamese and Communist Vietnamese colonisation of the Central Highlands have been compared to the historic Nam tiến of previous Vietnamese rulers. The South Vietnamese leader Diem sponsored colonisation of Northern Vietnamese Catholic refugees on Montagnard land. The now Communist Vietnamese government introduced to the Central Highlands of "New Economic Zones".

Japan
Tuntian is pronounced tonden as a Sino-Japanese word. It was most notably practiced during the Meiji Restoration in frontier Hokkaido under the name tondenhei ("tonden-soldiers").

Korea
The Sino-Korean reading of tuntian is dunjeon (or tunjŏn in the North Korean Romanization). Dunjeon was a core part of the Korean military supply and was notable in the following instances:
 During the Qing invasion of Joseon, at Namhansanseong. This system supported a population of 25,000, 10,000 of which were combatants.
 During the Imjin War, under Yi Sun-sin. He managed dunjeon both as part of his repeated demotion (due to court politics) and on his naval base of Hansando.

Place names 
Places with a history of tuntian cultivation may be named after the practice.
 , Japan
 , Chūō-ku, Sapporo, Japan
 Dunjeon station, Yongin, South Korea
 Tunjon station, South Hamgyong Province, North Korea

The following areas contain place names derived from a systematic tuntian designation:
 Various place names in China, especially Xinjiang, Inner Mongolia, and Heilongjiang.

See also

 Agriculture in China
 Economic history of China
 Theme (Byzantine district)

References

Bibliography 

 Chen, Shou. Records of the Three Kingdoms (Sanguozhi).
 Pei, Songzhi. Annotations to Records of the Three Kingdoms (Sanguozhi zhu).
 Sima, Guang. Zizhi Tongjian.

History of agriculture in China
Han dynasty